The 2017–18 season is the 109th season in CF Reus Deportiu ’s history.

Squad

Transfers
List of Spanish football transfers summer 2017#Reus

In

Out

Competitions

Overall

Liga

League table

Matches

Kickoff times are in CET.

Copa del Rey

References

CF Reus Deportiu seasons
Reus Deportiu